Potter's Lock is on the Kennet and Avon Canal, at Bedwyn, Wiltshire, England.

The lock has a rise/fall of 7 ft 6 in (2.28 m).

References

See also

Locks on the Kennet and Avon Canal

Locks on the Kennet and Avon Canal
Canals in Wiltshire